Teng Chang Yeow (born  1964) is a former Malaysian politician who served as the Member of the Penang State Legislative Assembly for Padang Kota from 1995 to 2008. He was also the former Secretary-General of the Parti Gerakan Rakyat Malaysia (GERAKAN), as well as the former Barisan Nasional (BN) Penang Chief.

Early life and education 
He is a younger brother to Teng Chang Khim, the former Speaker of the Selangor State Legislative Assembly and a Selangor State Executive Council member. Unlike Teng Chang Yeow himself, Teng Chang Khim is a member of the Democratic Action Party (DAP), a major component of the Pakatan Harapan (PH) coalition. Nevertheless, both are sons of Teng Boon Ngap, who was a prominent member of the Malaysian Chinese Association (MCA) before 1980s. They are also nephews to the former Tebrau MP Teng Boon Soon.

Prior to joining politics, Teng studied at Universiti Sains Malaysia (USM), and worked as a political secretary to the former Chief Minister of Penang Koh Tsu Koon. He served as a municipal councillor from 1992 to 1995.

Political career 
Teng was firstly elected to the Penang State Legislative Assembly for Padang Kota at the 1995 election, defeating Karpal Singh. He was kept elected in 1999 and in 2004, but lost to Chow Kon Yeow (who later became the Chief Minister of Penang) in 2008. Before he lost, he was one of the potential CM candidate that could succeed Koh Tsu Koon.

On 22 April 2012, Teng became the Barisan Nasional (BN) Penang Chief, replacing Koh. In the 2013 election, he contested for Bukit Tengah, but was defeated by Ong Chin Wen from the People's Justice Party (PKR). Following the 2013 election, he contested for the Parti Gerakan Rakyat Malaysia (GERAKAN) leadership election, but lost to Mah Siew Keong.

In the 2018 election, Teng was announced as the BN candidate for Tanjong Bunga, who fought against the PH unity candidate Zairil Khir Johari. He also previously assured that this would be the last election he contests. He, however, only obtained 3,902 votes and came far behind of Zairil.

The outcome of the election showed the worst result of the BN in the state, with just retaining 2 out of 40 seats in the state. The 2 were from the United Malays National Organisation (UMNO); no MCA or GERAKAN candidates were elected. The BN also lost its ruling party status since the country's independence in 1957. Chow Kon Yeow, whom Teng defeated him for 2 times before, inaugurated as the new Chief Minister of Penang.

Retirement 
After he was defeated in the 2018 Penang state election, Teng made an announcement to resign all positions he was holding, as well as retiring from politics.

General election results

References 

1960s births
Living people
Malaysian politicians
Malaysian people of Chinese descent